Bangor School Department is the school district of Bangor, Maine.

History
Betsy Webb served as superintendent until 2020. She left in October of that year. In November 2020 Kathy Harris-Smedberg began her term as a superintendent on an interim basis. On July 1, 2021, James Tager became the permanent superintendent.

In June 2022 the district sought to have the University of Maine go through the district's operations so the university can offer ideas on how to make the school district more inclusive of different backgrounds of students.

Schools
They include:

 High school (9-12)
 Bangor High School - The sole public high school

 Middle schools (6-8)
 James F. Doughty School
 William S. Cohen School

 Grade 4-5 schools
 Fairmount School
 Mary Snow School

 Grade K-3 schools
 Fourteenth Street School
 Downeast School
 Fruit Street School 
 Abraham Lincoln School
 Vine Street School

References

External links
 Bangor School Department

School districts in Maine
Education in Bangor, Maine